Jean-François Le Grand (born 8 June 1942 in Lessay, Manche) is a French politician and a former member of the Senate of France. He represented the Manche department as a member of the Union for a Popular Movement Party.

References
Page on the Senate website

1942 births
Living people
People from Manche
Politicians from Normandy
French Senators of the Fifth Republic
Union for a Popular Movement politicians
Senators of Manche
French veterinarians